The Canada women's national squash team represents Canada in international squash team competitions, and is governed by the Squash Canada.

Since 1979, Canada has finished in one fourth place of the World Squash Team Open, in 1979.

Current team
 Samantha Cornett
 Danielle Letourneau
 Hollie Naughton
 Nikki Todd

Results

World Team Squash Championships

See also 
 Squash Canada
 World Team Squash Championships
 Canada men's national squash team

References

External links 
 Team Canada

Women's national squash teams
Squash
Squash in Canada